L'Indépendant is a French-language newspaper published in Luxembourg from 1945.

Defunct newspapers published in Luxembourg
French-language newspapers published in Luxembourg
1945 in Luxembourg